Diving events at the 2021 Southeast Asian Games took place at Mỹ Đình Aquatics Center, in Hanoi, Vietnam from 8 to 11 May 2022. It is one of four aquatic sports at the Games, along with finswimming, swimming, and canoeing.

Summary 
Malaysia dominated the diving events again and won all the gold medals available again since the last SEA Games. Malaysia won eight gold medals, three silver medals and a bronze medal for a total of 12 medals. Singapore was second with a total of three silver medals and a bronze medal.

Participating nations

 (host)

Competition schedule
The following is the competition schedule for the diving competitions:

Medal table

Medalists

Men

Women

References

External links
 Official website 

 
2022 in diving